Villa Verde, located at 800 S. San Rafael in Pasadena, California, is a historic estate built in 1927. The estate was designed by Marston, Van Pelt & Maybury and is representative of their Spanish Colonial Revival designs. The design features extensive wrought iron ornamentation and a terra cotta roof. F. A. Hardy, former chairman of the Goodrich Corporation and a renowned horticulturist, first inhabited the house and planted its still-surviving garden.

The estate was listed on the National Register of Historic Places in 1984.

References

Houses in Pasadena, California
Houses completed in 1927
Houses on the National Register of Historic Places in California
Buildings and structures on the National Register of Historic Places in Pasadena, California
Spanish Colonial Revival architecture in California